The Kisumu Museum is a museum located in Kisumu, Kenya. Its exhibits focus on the natural and cultural history of Western Kenya. It features a collection of local flora and fauna, as well as a traditional Luo homestead.

The museum was opened 1980.

References

See also 
 List of museums in Kenya

Kisumu
Museums in Kenya
Museums established in 1980